Botyzhnaya is a rural locality (a village) in Verkhovskoye Rural Settlement, Verkhovazhsky District, Vologda Oblast, Russia. The population was 56 as of 2002.

Geography 
Botyzhnaya is located 40 km southwest of Verkhovazhye (the district's administrative centre) by road. Srednyaya is the nearest rural locality.

References 

Rural localities in Verkhovazhsky District